Dorking Wanderers Football Club is a semi-professional football club based in Dorking, Surrey, England.

History
The club was formed in 1999 and initially played in the Crawley & District League. After their first season in the Crawley League they switched to Division Four of the West Sussex League, winning the division at the first attempt. In 2001–02 the club finished as Division Three runners-up, earning a third consecutive promotion. After winning Division Two in 2003–04 they were promoted to Division One, and a third-place finish in Division One in 2005–06 saw them promoted to the Premier Division.

In 2006–07 Wanderers won the West Sussex League's Premier Division, clinching the title with a victory on the last day of the season. As a result, the club were promoted to Division Three of the Sussex County League. They went on to win Division Three in 2010–11, earning promotion to Division Two. A third-place finish in Division Two the following season was enough to see them promoted to Division One. However, the league initially denied them entry to the division as their ground was not deemed to meet the necessary requirements. However the club appealed against this decision to the Football Association, who over-ruled the decision after an independent ground grading visit confirmed that the ground reached the mandatory standards for Division One football. Although the team initially struggled in Division One, finishing third-from-bottom in 2012–13, they finished second in 2014–15, earning promotion to Division One South of the Isthmian League.

In Wanderers' first season in the Isthmian League they finished as runners-up in Division One South, qualifying for the promotion play-offs, going on to lose 2–1 to Faversham Town in the semi-finals. The following season saw them finish second again; in the play-offs they beat Hastings United on penalties in the semi-final after a 1–1 draw, and then won again on penalties against Corinthian-Casuals in the final following a 0–0 draw, earning promotion to the Premier Division. In 2018–19 the club won the Premier Division by a margin of 22 points, earning promotion to the National League South for their first time in history. 

Following the curtailment of the 2019–20 season due to the COVID-19 pandemic, they were placed seventh in the league table (decided on a points-per-game basis), qualifying for the promotion play-offs. After beating Bath City 2–1 in the quarter-finals, the club lost 3–2 to Weymouth in the semi-finals. The 2020–21 season was made null and void following a vote by member clubs of the National League, Dorking were sitting top of the league at the point the season was ended.

In the 2021–22 season Wanderers won their first Surrey Senior Cup Final, beating Kingstonian 5-4 on penalties after a 1–1 draw. In the 2021–22 season Dorking finished second in the league, going on to defeat Ebbsfleet United 3–2 in the play-off final, earning promotion to the National League for the first time in the club's history.

Reserve team
In 2015 the club's reserve team were promoted from the Suburban League to the Combined Counties League. However, they left the league at the end of the season as the club were set to groundshare with Dorking during the 2016–17 season. The reserve team rejoined the Combined Counties League at the start of the 2018–19 season.

Ground

The club initially played at Big Field Brockham, before moving to the Westhumble Playing Fields on London Road in 2007. The ground had a small seated stand and covered standing on one side of the pitch, with the remainder being uncovered; Floodlights were installed in 2012. In July 2018 the club relocated to a refurbished Meadowbank ground, which had previously been home to Dorking F.C. prior to their disbanding. Their first game at Meadowbank was a friendly match against Sutton United on 17 July 2018.

Meadowbank had become the home ground of Dorking F.C. in 1953. A 200-seat stand was built on one side of the pitch around 1956, with a covered standing area built on the other. Another covered standing area was installed behind one goal, with the other end left open. However, they were forced to leave the ground in 2013 after it was shut down for failing to meet health and safety requirements. Prior to Dorking Wanderers moving to the ground, it was upgraded to include a 300-seat stand, two covered standing areas and a 3G pitch as it was converted to a community sports facility at a cost of £5m. The Surrey County Football Association also moved their headquarters to Meadowbank when it reopened.

In February 2020 the club announced that planning permission had been granted to upgrade Meadowbank Stadium to a Grade B status. In July 2020, the stadium passed the Grade B status assessment. By September 2020 work had been completed on a new seated stand and a new covered terrace both at the east end of the ground, taking Meadowbank's official capacity to 3,000

Current squad

Out on loan

Honours
Isthmian League
Premier Division champions 2018–19
Southern Combination
Division Three champions 2010–11
West Sussex League
Premier Division champions 2006–07
Division Two North champions 2003–04
Division Four North champions 2000–01
Surrey Senior Cup
Winners 2021–22

Records
Best FA Cup performance: Fourth qualifying round, 2021–22
Best FA Trophy performance: Fifth round, 2022–23
Best FA Vase performance: Second qualifying round, 2012–13, 2013–14, 2014–15
Record attendance: 3,000 vs Ebbsfleet United, National League South play-off final, 21 May 2022

See also
Dorking Wanderers F.C. players

References

External links

Official website
Meadowbank

 
Football clubs in England
Football clubs in Surrey
Association football clubs established in 1999
1999 establishments in England
Crawley and District Football League
West Sussex Football League
Southern Combination Football League
Isthmian League
Dorking
National League (English football) clubs